Maurice T. Moloney (July 26, 1849 – March 9, 1917) was an American lawyer.

Born in County Kerry, Ireland, Moloney emigrated to the United States in 1867. He studied at the Roman Catholic Seminary of Our Lady of Angels at Niagara Falls, New York and then studied theology in Latrobe, Pennsylvania and Wheeling, West Virginia. Moloney then studied law at the University of Virginia School of Law and graduated in 1871. He then moved to Ottawa, Illinois and was admitted to the Illinois bar. Moloney practiced law in Ottawa, Illinois and served as city attorney. From 1884 to 1888, Moloney served as state's attorney for LaSalle County, Illinois and was a Democrat. Moloney served as Illinois Attorney General from 1893 to 1897. In 1899, Moloney was elected mayor of Ottawa, Illinois. Moloney died suddenly at his home in Ottawa, Illinois.

Notes

1849 births
1917 deaths
People from County Kerry
People from Ottawa, Illinois
Politicians from Niagara Falls, New York
Irish emigrants to the United States (before 1923)
University of Virginia School of Law alumni
Virginia lawyers
Illinois Democrats
Mayors of places in Illinois
Illinois Attorneys General
19th-century American politicians
19th-century American lawyers